Plinking refers to informal target shooting done for pleasure, typically at non-standard targets such as tin cans, logs, bottles, or any other homemade or naturally occurring target.

Practice
In contrast to shooting done at established target ranges, plinking is generally done at home, in an open field, or other private land for no fee.  The term plinking is an onomatopoeia of the sharp, metallic sound (or "plink") that a projectile makes when hitting a metal target such as a tin can.

The most common caliber used for plinking is the .22 Long Rifle rimfire cartridge, since these rounds are relatively inexpensive and have a low recoil; however, any caliber can be used in plinking, and it is not unusual to see a person plinking with a full power rifle or pistol. Air guns and airsoft guns are also used, often for cost or safety reasons or because they are subject to less stringent regulation - a similar practice with a bow and arrow is usually termed "stump shooting".

Appeal

The primary attributes of plinking that make it appealing as a sport are as follows: easy availability and broad variety of locations, minimum cost, freedom in practice, outdoors environment, and more engaging shooting experience when compared to established target ranges.  Since not all people have reasonable access to a target range, outdoor shooting done at home or other nearby piece of land is a natural alternative, and for many, homemade shooting ranges are the only way to keep up good marksmanship.

Since target ranges generally charge a fee for the use of their facilities, and shooters usually have to buy their own paper targets, going to a target range can incur significant costs, especially when added up over time.  In addition, gun ranges by necessity have many strict rules about the use of their facilities, concerning shot rate, types of ammunition and firearms permitted, where the shooter is allowed to stand, and when they can go downrange to check their targets, which some shooters may find stifling.  Many shooters also find the open air to be a much more pleasant shooting environment than the inside of a target range, which is usually made of concrete and steel.

By contrast, plinking can be done at home whenever the urge strikes, for merely the cost of ammunition, as the targets used are generally any item of suitable size that conveniently comes to hand, with beverage cans being one of the more popular choices.  Plinking can be done alone at the individual pace of the shooter, who is free to move around at will, or in a group, which of course requires the use of some pre-determined safety measures.

The targets themselves that are used are one of the main reasons why plinking is popular among gun enthusiasts, especially hunters.  A three dimensional target in an outdoors setting is much more akin to a real world hunting scenario, allowing a hunter the opportunity for practice.  Since any reasonably sized object, from a soda can or a charcoal briquet to an arbitrary spot on a tree can be used as a target, a three dimensional plinking range can easily be set up that will simulate situations commonly found while hunting small game, such as when the animal is behind cover, or up in a tree.  A plinking target will also often react much more positively to a hit than a paper target will, either with an audible impact, or visual confirmation by moving, splattering or falling over.  Steel targets, which are used for formal action and long range shooting competitions, are also popular among plinksters due to their relative ease to set up, as well as their clear evidence of good hits.

See also
 Glossary of firearms terminology
 List of rifle cartridges
 Hunting
 Target shooting

References

External links

 Power Plinker  - Promoting the benefits of plinking.

Shooting sports